Inside U.S.A. or Inside USA may refer to:

 Inside U.S.A. (book), a 1947 book by John Gunther
 Inside U.S.A., a 1948-1949 Broadway musical revue loosely based on the book
 Inside USA, a 2008 Al-Jazeera documentary series by filmmaker Avi Lewis

See also
 Inside America, Australian film
 Main Street, U.S.A., Disney attraction
 See the USA in Your Chevrolet